Richmond Hill is one of the seven train lines of the GO Transit system in the Greater Toronto Area, Ontario, Canada. It operates between Union Station in Toronto to Bloomington GO Station in the north in Richmond Hill. Trains on the line operate only during weekday peak hours (morning trains southbound, afternoon trains northbound), while off-peak weekday times are served by the GO bus route 61.

History
A Richmond Hill commuter train service had been announced in 1969 by the provincial government, but its implementation was cancelled in 1970 in favour of bus commuter service.

Following a promotional opening on Saturday April 29, the Richmond Hill line became the fourth GO Transit rail line on Monday, May 1, 1978.  The opening had been delayed because the BiLevel coaches ordered for the Lakeshore line were not delivered on time, so existing Lakeshore line trains were not available to be redeployed on the Richmond Hill line.

The layout of the line remained generally unchanged from 1978 to 2016, when the line was extended north to the new Gormley station.  This extension was part of the GO 2020 strategy, which aims to extend the line north to Aurora Road in Whitchurch-Stouffville. Phase I of the project, which was completed in late 2016, established the Gormley GO Station where the line intersects Stouffville Road, created a train layover facility at Bethesda Road, and graded the corridor for the extension. Phase II of the project, which was completed in June 2021, extended the line further north to Bloomington GO Station.

Route
The Richmond Hill line operates over the CN Bala Subdivision, which is owned by Metrolinx between Union Station and Doncaster Diamond, where the line crosses the CN York Subdivision.  North of Doncaster Diamond, the line is owned by Canadian National and is part of its transcontinental freight route.

The Via Rail Canadian transcontinental service from Vancouver to Toronto operates along the entire route of the Richmond Hill line, but does not stop at any stations other than Union.

During regular service, the Richmond Hill line operates trains that are six to ten coaches long. Due to diminishing ridership during the COVID-19 pandemic, GO Transit is reducing the number of coaches on all Richmond Hill line trains from six to four cars. Following successful testing of four-car trains operating on the line beginning on April 19, 2021, all train trips on the Richmond Hill line are four cars long effective May 5, 2021.

Stations

Future
As a part of the GO Transit Regional Express Rail (RER) initiative, train service along the Richmond Hill line is planned to be expanded over the next decade. During peak hours, trains would run in peak direction every 15–30 minutes along this line. To implement the planned RER service, the Richmond Hill line would need $1 billion in flood mitigation and a grade separation at the Doncaster junction with the York Subdivision.

A layover facility was planned in the Don Valley adjacent to the Don Valley Parkway underneath the Prince Edward Viaduct as part of the GO Expansion program. In March 2023, Metrolinx found a different site for the planned facility in a light industrial zone at York Mills Road east of Leslie Street. GO Transit will use the Rosedale Siding adjacent to Bayview Avenue along the route as a temporary layover facility.

See also
 Toronto Transit Commission
 York Region Transit
 Canadian National Railways

References

External links

 GO Transit: Richmond Hill GO Train & Bus Service Schedule (PDF)
 

GO Transit
Passenger rail transport in Toronto
Rail transport in Markham, Ontario
Rail transport in Richmond Hill, Ontario
Passenger rail transport in the Regional Municipality of York
Railway lines opened in 1978
1978 establishments in Ontario